Declan Casey (born 24 January 2000) is an Australian professional rugby league footballer who plays as a  or  for the Canterbury-Bankstown Bulldogs in the NRL (National Rugby League).

Background
He is the son of former St George Dragons and North Sydney Bears player Stephen Casey.

Playing career

2022
Casey made his NRL debut in round 16 of the 2022 NRL season against the Cronulla-Sutherland Sharks. Casey’s NRL debut was cut short after a sickening head knock in Canterbury's 18-6 loss to the Cronulla side which saw the 22-year-old taken from the field on a medi cab. Casey was knocked to the ground in the 52nd minute after attempting a tackle on Cronulla prop Andrew Fifita.

Casey played for Canterbury's NSW Cup team in their 29-22 grand final loss to Penrith with Casey scoring a try during the game.

References

External links
Canterbury Bulldogs profile

2000 births
Australian rugby league players
Canterbury-Bankstown Bulldogs players
Living people